The Minister of Foreign Affairs of the People's Democratic Republic of Algeria is a cabinet minister in charge of the Ministry of Foreign Affairs of Algeria, responsible for conducting foreign relations of the country.

The following is a list of foreign ministers of Algeria since the establishment of the GPRA in 1958:

References

Foreign
Foreign Ministers
Politicians
Foreign ministers of Algeria